The Medan Light Rail Transit (Medan LRT) is a planned light rail transit system in Medan, Indonesia. Made due to concerns of the congested future of the city, the government deems the project, alongside the Bus Rapid Transit (BRT), necessary. The project was announced in 2017 as a public-private partnership, with many international corporations began bidding. Construction began in 2019, but was disturbed the next year due to the COVID-19 pandemic. The LRT will use one rolling stock, with more than 20 stations divided into three lines.

History
Medan, home to more than 2.5 million people, offers several modes of public transportation. Every year, the city experiences an average of 0.3% increase in population. Despite that, 98% of the population uses private transportation instead of the publics. If this continues, by 2024, Medan could be gridlocked. Vice Mayor Akhyar Nasution called the need for a rail system "mandatory" and not "for fun" as many would think. Other than gridlock prevention, the 2024 National Sports Week (PON) will be held in Medan, hinting the need for easy mobility. Along with the Bus Rapid Transit (BRT), the Medan Light Rail Transit (Medan LRT) is part of a governmental masterplan (RPJMN) of 2020–2024, and is expected to have 4,473,996 passengers per year. On 5 May, 2017, the government of Medan settled an agreement with the Indonesian Ministry of Finance in regards to the facilities the light rail transit system will have.

The project was given a concession period of 20 years. On 6 June, 2017, detik.com revealed that the total budget required to create the LRT requires Rp 6,34 billion or US$477.4 million, including Rp 2,2 billion for rolling stock; this later changes to Rp 12,339 billion, and then Rp 20,3 billion. Budgeting for the project uses blended finance to not involve state budget.

As a public-private partnership, the project has an availability payment of Rp 5,755 billion/year. SMRT Corporation announced it will help with the project using their experiences. In 2018, companies from China and South Korea have expressed interest in developing the project. In June 2019, Korea Rail Network Authority was announced as the preferred partner, and that the LRT will connect the areas of Medan, Binjai, Deli Serdang and Karo, collectively named Mebidangro, which is also the LRT's nickname. The International Monetary Fund (IMF) and the World Bank also expressed interest in an LRT system in Medan. Coordinator of the Ministry of Maritimes Affairs and Fisheries Luhut Binsar Pandjaitan asked for the project to use 60% of "local components" and not foreign products as a redemption to the government's financial shortcomings, which they did, with the help of PT Kereta Api Indonesia (INKA), with the help of the Ministry of State Owned Enterprises (BUMN). On 5 April 2019, an open-to-public press conference was held; 190 people attended it.

The project's online business case ended in 2019, and the final business case commenced in late 2020. Throughout that year, it underwent a phase of worthiness test and "Detail Engineering Design" (DED). Construction of the LRT started in 2019 and the LRT itself was expected to begin operations in 2020, however it was affected by the COVID-19 pandemic. Planning and conferences, though, still continues amid the pandemic, even though progress slowed down. North Sumatra's Development Planning Board secretary Yosi Sukmono said that construction should continue in 2021. Before the pandemic, it was expected to finish by 2023. Planning and conferences include studying which places would mandate stations, as well as the LRT's accessibility. In August 2020, construction was planned to finish in 2023 and operations to begin in early 2024.

Infrastructure 

The LRT will use a Bombardier B700 rolling stock similar to the Docklands Light Railway (DLR). It will have a maximum speed of 80 km/h. With 20 units, it cost Rp 488.016 billion.

All stations will be infill and elevated, with the tracks spanning  in total. The LRT was initially announced to comprise 22 stations from the southwest to northeast of Medan, forming one line. Later, however, it was expanded to three:

Line 1: Medan to Sport Center Batang Kuis station (spanning )
 Line 2: Aksara to Lau Cih station (spanning )
 Line 3: Pancing to Cemara station (spanning )

The stations were also reduced to 17. A train depot will also be built at Lau Cih station. The budget for the stations, tracks, depot, and other operation facilities altogether create a budget of Rp 16.9 trillion.

Transit-oriented development was taken into account in selecting the station locations. The termini was initially planned to be Medan and Universitas Medan station, but this was later cancelled. Other stations include: RS Adam Malik, Sekolah Siti Hajar, Santo Thomas, Ring Road, Pasar II, Perumahan Setiabudi, Raz Plaza, USU Pintu IV, RS USU, Iskandar Muda, Kampung Madras, RS Malahayati, Walikota, Lapangan Merdeka, Podomoro City, Hotel Grand Angkasa, RS Pringadi, Masjid 45, Al Amin Faisal Tanjung, and Aksara station. Later, Cemara, Sport Center Batang Kuis and Pancing station were also announced.

See also 

 Jakarta LRT
 Palembang LRT

Explanatory notes

References

Rapid transit in Indonesia
Light rail in Indonesia